The ZCBJ Hall is a building in Tyndall, South Dakota, United States that historically served as a meeting hall for the Czech community. The building, formerly a high school, was purchased by Zapadni Ceska Bratrska Jednota from the Tyndall Independent School Dist. No.3 in 1908.  It was listed on the National Register of Historic Places on January 31, 1985.

See also
 Czech-Slovak Protective Society

References

External links

 One Hundred Years of Tyndall - A Centennial History
 Tyndall, Yesterday and Today

Czech-American culture in South Dakota
Western Fraternal Life Association
Clubhouses on the National Register of Historic Places in South Dakota
Buildings and structures in Bon Homme County, South Dakota
Buildings and structures completed in 1908
National Register of Historic Places in Bon Homme County, South Dakota
1908 establishments in South Dakota